The 1974 Colorado Buffaloes football team was an American football team that represented the University of Colorado in the Big Eight Conference during the 1974 NCAA Division I football season. In their first season under head coach Bill Mallory, the Buffaloes compiled a 5–6 record (3–4 in Big 8, fifth), and were outscored 307 to 226. Home games were played on campus at Folsom Field in Boulder, Colorado.

Hired in January, Mallory was previously the head coach at undefeated Miami University in Ohio.

Schedule

References

External links
University of Colorado Athletics – 1974 football roster
Sports-Reference – 1974 Colorado Buffaloes

Colorado
Colorado Buffaloes football seasons
Colorado Buffaloes football